Hans Thoma (2 October 1839 – 7 November 1924) was a German painter.

Biography
Hans Thoma was born on 2 October 1839 in Bernau in the Black Forest, Germany. He was the son of a miller and was trained in the basics of painting by a painter of clock faces. He entered the Karlsruhe Academy in 1859, where he studied under Johann Wilhelm Schirmer and Ludwig des Coudres – the latter of which had a major influence on his career. He subsequently studied and worked, with but indifferent success, in Düsseldorf, Paris, Italy, Munich and Frankfurt, until his reputation became firmly established as the result of an exhibition of some thirty of his paintings in Munich. He died in Karlsruhe in 1924 at the age of 85.

Style

In spite of his studies under various masters, his art has little in common with modern ideas, and is formed partly by his early impressions of the simple idyllic life of his native district, partly by his sympathy with the early German masters, particularly with Albrecht Altdorfer and Lucas Cranach the Elder. In his love of the details of nature, in his precise drawing of outline, and in his predilection for local coloring, he has distinct affinities with the Pre-Raphaelites.

Works

Many of his pictures have found their way into two private collections in Liverpool. A portrait of the artist and two subject pictures, The Guardian of the Valley and Spring Idyll are at the Galerie Neue Meister; Eve in Paradise and The Open Valley at the Städel. Other important pictures of his are Paradise, Christ and Nicodemus, The Flight into Egypt, Charon, Pietà, Adam and Eve, Solitude, Tritons, besides many landscapes and portraits.

He also produced numerous lithographs and pen drawings, and some decorative mural paintings, notably in a café at Frankfurt, and in the music room of the Alfred Pringsheim house in Munich.

Thoma's artwork was favored by Nazis during the Third Reich 1933-1945 and he was listed among official painters. Artworks acquired for Adolf Hitler's planned Führermuseum in Linz included Badende Jünglinge (bathing boys), looted from the Jewish collector Adolf Bensinger in 1939, and Blick auf Mamolsheim, looted from the Jewish collectors Martin and Florence Flersheim. Other artworks by Thoma that were acquired during the Nazi era from Jewish collectors include “Dusk at Lake Garda”, looted from the Jewish collector Ottmar Strauss, “Springtime in the Mountains/Children’s Dance,” sold under duress in 1938 by Hedwig Ullmann, Sin­nendes Mädchen / Frau mit Schim­mel (‘Pen­sive Girl/Women with White Horse’) (Lost Art-ID 302432) looted from the Jewish art collector Smoschewer in 1939 and The Rhine at Säckingen in the Black Forest formerly owned by Max Emden. The German Lost Art Database lists several paintings by Thoma.

References

External links
German masters of the nineteenth century: paintings and drawings from the Federal Republic of Germany, a full text exhibition catalog from The Metropolitan Museum of Art, which contains material on Hans Thoma (nos. 91–95)

1839 births
1924 deaths
People from Waldshut (district)
People from the Grand Duchy of Baden
19th-century German painters
19th-century German male artists
German male painters
20th-century German painters
20th-century German male artists
Recipients of the Pour le Mérite (civil class)